Ituata District is one of ten districts of the Carabaya Province in Peru.

Geography 
The Kallawaya mountain range traverses the district. Other mountains are listed below:

Ethnic groups 
The people in the district are mainly indigenous citizens of Quechua descent. Quechua is the language which the majority of the population (92.94%) learnt to speak in childhood, 6.02% of the residents started speaking using the Spanish language (2007 Peru Census).

See also 
 Kimsaqucha

References